Mountain High resort is a winter resort in the San Gabriel Mountains in Los Angeles County in California. Mountain High is one of the most-visited resorts in Southern California. The resort is located along State Route 2 west of Wrightwood, California.

History

Coinciding with the population growth of Southern California in the 1920s, hikers and ski enthusiasts began using Big Pines, an area near the present day Mountain High resort. In 1929 the construction began on the world's largest ski jump of that time in an attempt to attract the 1932 Winter Olympics.

The Mountain High West Resort was originally known as Blue Ridge and is one of the oldest ski resorts in the country. Its first year of operation was 1937 with a rope tow, and it built the 2nd chairlift in California in 1947. In 1975, upon being sold by its original owners, it was renamed Mountain High.

The Mountain High East Resort, originally known as Holiday Hill, opened in 1948. In the 1960s, the cost of a lift ticket was $1.50. In 1979, the resort was sold to the new owner of the Mountain High resort and used primarily as parking for the West Resort, as well as add terrain when there was adequate snow and skiing conditions.

The Mountain High North Resort was originally known as Table Mountain Ski Area in 1938 and later changed to Ski Sunrise in 1975. Due to several years of poor snow conditions and lack of snowmaking equipment, it was sold in 2004 to the owners of Mountain High. Mountain High now operates the North Resort as a ski school, tubing and snow play area to relieve congestion at the West Resort, but have not yet installed snowmaking equipment there. Table Mountain has been used previously as a U.S. Geologic Survey site and a Smithsonian Museum site.

Mountain High was sold to Oaktree Capital Management in 1997. Valor Equity Partners acquired Mountain High in 2005. CNL Lifestyle acquired Mountain High in 2007 and leased it back to resort management. CNL sold the resort to Och-Ziff Capital Management in 2016. Resort management acquired the Mountain High property from Och-Ziff in 2017.

Resort

Mountain High's resort is separated into three different areas along State Route 2. Lift tickets purchased at any one of the areas are good at the other two, and a shuttle normally operates between the west and east resorts, ferrying skiers and snowboarders back and forth.

The Mountain High West Resort
At -), the West Resort is the most popular of the three resorts, and most of its terrain has been dedicated to Mountain High's Terrain Park. The Terrain park contains many original terrain features such as the Slayer Box, and the Paradox catering mostly to the sport of snowboarding. Aside from the terrain parks, the West Resort also has excellent glade skiing and snowboarding in an area known as "The Reef." This area is only open when there is a substantial amount of snow. Due to its slightly higher elevation, the West Resort is often the first resort in Southern California to open and the last to close.

The Mountain High East Resort
At (-) the East Resort has longer runs and more open terrain providing a more alpine snowsports experience.

The Mountain High North Resort
At (-) the North Resort is dedicated to mainly beginner and intermediate terrain and snow play. This resort, formerly known as Ski Sunrise, only has one quad chair lift and three handle tows. It is also the location of the Yeti snow play area.

Sky High Disc Golf Course
 The Mountain High North Resort is open during the summer to offer disc golf. "Sky High" offers three courses with nine holes that meander throughout the Angeles National Forest. The course was first developed in 1999 by Dave Dunipace when the resort was still known as Ski Sunrise.

References

External links
 
 Mountain High Ski Patrol Website
 Mountain High Media Kit
 Mountain High Trail Map
 Sunrise Disc Golf
 Wrightwoodca.com: Skiing and Snowboarding in Wrightwood
 Bigpinesskiclub.html: History of Big Pines, Big Pines Ski Club, + Wrightwood — includes photos.

Ski areas and resorts in California
Angeles National Forest
San Gabriel Mountains
Wrightwood, California
Hill and mountain resorts
Sports venues in Los Angeles County, California
Tourist attractions in Los Angeles County, California